Sansar is a social virtual reality platform, for Microsoft Windows only, developed by the San Francisco-based firm Linden Lab, and now owned by Sansar Inc. It launched in “creator beta” to the general public on July 31, 2017. The platform enables user-created 3D spaces where people can create and share interactive social experiences, such as playing games, watching videos, and having conversations in VR. Each participant is represented by a detailed avatar that is the graphical representation of the user including speech-driven facial animations and motion-driven body animations.

Sansar supports both virtual reality headsets (including the Oculus Rift and HTC Vive) and Windows computers, and is free to use, with advanced features available for paying subscribers.

History 

In 2014, Linden Lab announced its intent to develop a “next-generation virtual world” in the spirit of its popular virtual world Second Life.

In 2015, more details about the project became public including its positioning as a social virtual reality platform. While the product name had not yet been made public, media reports initially referred to the initiative by its internal development codename Project Sansar. By the end of the same year, a small number of 3D content creators were invited to participate in an early alpha version.

As development progressed in 2016, more invitations were extended to a larger pool of creators for access to the “creator preview” version of what would soon be officially branded Sansar. The word "sansar" (संसार) is Sanskrit for "world".

Availability to the general public began in 2017 with the debut of the “creator beta.” 

In 2019, Sansar partnered with electronic music record label Monstercat to bring live entertainment to a virtual reality setting, as part of the latter's eight year anniversary.

In February 2020, Linden Lab announced that they will no longer be supporting Sansar and are looking for a new owner for the project. Wookey Project Corp. purchased all of the assets under the Sansar name to animate the contents of the web under the direction of its Chief Executive Officer Jonathan Fried.  Instead, Linden Lab will concentrate on its legacy virtual world platform Second Life.

On March 23, 2020, Linden Labs announced the sale of Sansar to San Francisco-based technology company Wookey Project Corp, to continue Sansar's current event based strategy. Despite successful event launches and events up to 4.2M concurrent users, Wookey ultimately suffered from lack of funding and infighting among CEO and ownership.

On April 29, 2022, the assets of Sansar were sold to Sansar Inc.  The new CEO, Chance Richie, stated on the community Discord channel that the new management team will be focusing on the future and making Sansar the most Creator-friendly Metaverse on the planet.  The CEO's vision is focused on realizing Sansar's potential by providing the Creator community the tools they need to build the most engaging worlds, quests, and experiences in the Metaverse.

Economy 

Like Second Life, Sansar has its own virtual economy and unit of trade. Sansar users can buy and sell virtual creations using the "Sansar dollar" (S$). Sansar dollars can be purchased online via the Sansar Dollar Exchange (SandeX) or earned by selling items in the Sansar Store. While the virtual economy of Sansar is still in its infancy, many observers compare its eventual potential to Second Life’s robust economy which in 2016 saw $500 million in user-to-user transactions and about $60 million taken home by creators.

Community 
Sansar has gained popularity with music artists due to its best in class photo realism and concurrency capabilities.  It has been used to re-create real life events in the metaverse. 

Most notably, the Lost Horizon music festival was hosted in Sansar during the COVID19 lockdown.  The event first launched as a global virtual reality venue, with a two day, four stage festival. The captivating VR event was inspired by the hedonistic Shangri-La portion of the annual Glastonbury music festival.  The event attracted 4.36 million people, featuring virtual versions of real life Shangri-La stages.

See also
VRChat
High Fidelity
Linden Lab

References

External links
 

Virtual economies
Video games developed in the United States
Virtual reality communities
Virtual reality games
Windows games
Windows-only games